Valentin Alexandru Simion (born 6 October 1986 in Bucharest, Romania) is a retired Romanian footballer.

He started his career at Steaua București. In 2009–10, Simion was demoted to the B squad. On 15 August 2009 Valentin Simion scored first goal in the history of Steaua II București in the Liga II.

Honours
Steaua București
Romanian Championship League: 2004–05

Notes
 The 2004–2005 and 2005–2006 Liga III appearances and goals made for Steaua II București are unavailable.

External links
 Valentin Simion at SteauaFC.com 
 

1986 births
Living people
Footballers from Bucharest
Romanian footballers
Association football forwards
FC Steaua București players
FC Steaua II București players
FC UTA Arad players
FC Gloria Buzău players
CS Pandurii Târgu Jiu players
CS Brănești players
CS Concordia Chiajna players
Liga I players